Zafar Iqbal Chaudhry (born 6 March 1969) is a former Pakistani cricketer who played eight One Day Internationals in 1995.

References

1969 births
Living people
Pakistan One Day International cricketers
Pakistani cricketers
Pakistan National Shipping Corporation cricketers
National Bank of Pakistan cricketers
Karachi Whites cricketers
Karachi Blues cricketers
Karachi cricketers
Cricketers from Karachi